Longview Airport may refer to:

East Texas Regional Airport, serving Longview, Texas
Longview Ranch Airport, a private airport in Wheeler County, Oregon
Southwest Washington Regional Airport, formerly known as Kelso-Longview Airport

See also
 Longview (disambiguation)